The Black Mountain Masters was a golf tournament on the Asian Tour, played in Thailand. The inaugural tournament was held in 2009 at the Black Mountain Golf Club and the prize fund was US$500,000. Johan Edfors won the inaugural tournament and earned $79,250.

Winners

External links
Coverage on Asian Tour's official site

Former Asian Tour events
Golf tournaments in Thailand
Recurring sporting events established in 2009
Recurring sporting events disestablished in 2010
2009 establishments in Thailand
2010 disestablishments in Thailand